Volodymyr Vakulenko (Volodymyr Volodymyrovych Vakulenko; 1 July 1972 – 2022) was a Ukrainian poet, children's writer, and Wikipedian, who was also involved in volunteer work and activism. He was killed during the Russian occupation of the Kharkiv area in Ukraine in 2022. He was a recipient of the Oles Ulianenko International Literary Award and laureate of the   Competition.

Vakulenko was abducted by Russian invaders near Izium before being killed during the temporary occupation of Kharkiv Oblast. This is reported by PEN Ukraine, quoting Vakulenko's ex-wife, Iryna Novytska, who wrote that "Vakulenko's parents were informed that, following the results of the DNA expertise, it was their son's body in the grave №319".

Vakulenko is survived by his 14-year-old son Vitalii and his parents.

See also 

 List of Wikipedia people

References

External links
 

1972 births
2022 deaths
21st-century male writers
21st-century Ukrainian writers
People from Izium
People killed in the 2022 Russian invasion of Ukraine
Ukrainian children's writers
Ukrainian male writers
Wikipedia people